Lieutenant James Tennant MC (born 27 February 1896, date of death unknown) was a Scottish World War I flying ace credited with seven aerial victories.

Military service
Tennant worked in a bank in Newton Stewart, Scotland, before the war. In 1917 he was assigned to No. 20 Squadron as a gunner/observer flying the F.E.2d two-seater. He scored his first aerial victory on 9 June 1917, the same day the squadron lost Francis Cubbon and Frederick Thayre. Four days later, on 13 June, Tennant was teamed with fellow ex-bank clerk Harry Luchford; Tennant would score six victories in a row with Luchford, beginning that day and ending on 17 August 1917.

References
Notes

Bibliography
 

1896 births
Year of death missing
Royal Flying Corps officers
Recipients of the Military Cross
People from Dumfries and Galloway
Queen's Own Cameron Highlanders officers
Scottish military personnel
Scottish flying aces
British World War I flying aces